

Littlewood's law states that a person can expect to experience events with odds of one in a million (referred to as a "miracle") at the rate of about one per month. It was framed by British mathematician John Edensor Littlewood.

History
The law was framed by Cambridge University  Professor John Edensor Littlewood, and published in a 1986 collection of his work, A Mathematician's Miscellany. It seeks among other things to debunk one element of supposed supernatural phenomenology and is related to the more general law of truly large numbers, which states that with a sample size large enough, any outrageous (in terms of probability model of single sample) thing is likely to happen.

Description
Littlewood defines a miracle as an exceptional event of special significance occurring at a frequency of one in a million. He assumes that during the hours in which a human is awake and alert, a human will see or hear one "event" per second, which may be either exceptional or unexceptional. Additionally, Littlewood supposes that a human is alert for about eight hours per day.

As a result, a human will in 35 days have experienced under these suppositions about one million events. Accepting this definition of a miracle, one can expect to observe one miraculous event for every 35 days' time, on average – and therefore, according to this reasoning, seemingly miraculous events are actually commonplace.

See also

 Coincidence
 Confirmation bias
 Gambler's fallacy
 List of eponymous laws
 Micromort
 Orders of magnitude (probability)
 Spurious relationship
 Synchronicity

References

Littlewood's Miscellany, edited by B. Bollobás, Cambridge University Press; 1986. 
Debunked! ESP, Telekinesis, Other Pseudoscience,  Georges Charpak and Henri Broch, translated from the French by Bart K. Holland, Johns Hopkins University Press.

External links
Littlewood's Law described in a review of Debunked! ESP, Telekinesis, Other Pseudoscience by Freeman Dyson, in The New York Review of Books 

Statistical laws
Probability theory paradoxes
Miracles
Skepticism